Istrianis fynbosella is a moth of the family Gelechiidae. It is found in South Africa.

References

Moths described in 2011
Istrianis